Margveti Zestafoni was a Georgian association football club based in Zestafoni between 1990 and 2000.

History
In 1990 the Georgian Football Federation was founded to hold their own football competition and leave the Soviet football league system. Clubs like FC Dinamo Tbilisi and FC Guria Lanchkhuti gave up their place in the Soviet Top League to join.

At that time Zestafoni had their own club FC Metallurg Zestafoni. A new club, formed as Margveti Zestafoni, joined Pirveli Liga and was promoted in the first season.
Margveti was a member of Umaglesi Liga and achieved their best season in 1995–96 by finishing runner-up. But in the 1997–98 season, Margveti finished at the bottom and was relegated. 

FC Margveti Zestafoni faced financial problems and was declared bankrupt in 2000.

A new club using the city legend team name Metalurgi Zestafoni was formed in 1999. In 2006 Margveti-2006 was founded in the lower division and recently in Meore Liga, but it is a different (municipal) club.

Notable players
Zviad Endeladze became the club's most famous player after scoring 40 goals in a single season. With this achievement he joined the European Golden Shoe winners.

City rival
Although Metallurgi Zestafoni, Margveti Zestafoni and FC Zestafoni came from the same city, they never met in the league, and both clubs came from the succession of Metallurgi Zestafoni.

Seasons
{|class="wikitable"
|-bgcolor="#efefef"
! Season
! League
! Pos.
! Pl.
! W
! D
! L
! GF
! GA
! P
! Cup
! Europe
! Notes
! Manager
|-
|align=right|1990
|align=right bgcolor=#ffa07a|Pirveli Liga
|align=right bgcolor=silver|2
|align=right|38||align=right|28||align=right|3||align=right|7
|align=right|102||align=right|44||align=right|87
|rowspan=2|Round of 32
|rowspan=4 align=center|N/A
|Promoted
|
|-
|align=right|1991
|align=right|Umaglesi Liga
|align=right|8
|align=right|19||align=right|8||align=right|3||align=right|8
|align=right|32||align=right|32||align=right|27
|
|
|-
|align=right|1991–92
|align=right|Umaglesi Liga
|align=right|8
|align=right|38||align=right|14||align=right|11||align=right|13
|align=right|60||align=right|58||align=right|53
|Round of 16
|
|
|-
|align=right|1992–93
|align=right|Umaglesi Liga
|align=right|6
|align=right|32||align=right|15||align=right|5||align=right|12
|align=right|49||align=right|54||align=right|50
|bgcolor=cc9966|Semi-finals
|
|
|-
|align=right|1993–94
|align=right|Umaglesi Liga Champ.Group
|align=right|8
|align=right| 18||align=right|4 ||align=right|3 ||align=right|11
|align=right| 22||align=right|41 ||align=right|15
|
|
|
|
|-
|align=right|1994–95
|align=right|Umaglesi Liga
|align=right|9
|align=right|30||align=right|10||align=right|6||align=right|14
|align=right|35||align=right|53||align=right|36
|Round of 32
|
|
|
|-
|align=right|1995–96
|align=right|Umaglesi Liga
|align=right bgcolor=silver|2
|align=right|30||align=right|22||align=right|2||align=right|6
|align=right|85||align=right|37||align=right|68
|bgcolor=cc9966|Semi-finals
|
|
|
|-
|align=right|1996–97
|align=right|Umaglesi Liga
|align=right|7
|align=right|30||align=right|12||align=right|2||align=right|16
|align=right|44||align=right|66||align=right|38
|Quarter-finals
|UEFA Cup Preliminary round
|
|
|-
|align=right|1997–98
|align=right|Umaglesi Liga
|align=right|16
|align=right|30||align=right|2||align=right|7||align=right|21
|align=right|21||align=right|75||align=right|13
|Round of 32
|
|Relegated
|
|-
|align=right|1998–99
|align=right bgcolor=#ffa07a|Pirveli Liga West
|align=right|2
|align=right| 24||align=right| 18||align=right| 4||align=right|2
|align=right| 78||align=right| 24||align=right|58
|Round of 32
|
|
|
|-
|align=right|1999-00
|align=right bgcolor=#ffa07a|Pirveli Liga
|align=right|1
|align=right|22 ||align=right|18 ||align=right|4 ||align=right|0
|align=right|71||align=right|18 ||align=right|58
|Round of 16
|
|
|
|}
Reserve
{|class="wikitable"
|-bgcolor="#efefef"
! Season
! League
! Pos.
! Pl.
! W
! D
! L
! GF
! GA
! P
! Notes
! Manager
|-
|align=right|1995–96
|align=right bgcolor=#ffa07a|Pirveli Liga West
|align=right|17
|align=right|38||align=right|12||align=right|3||align=right|23
|align=right|54||align=right|83||align=right|39
|
|
|-
|}

Eurocups

References

External links

Margveti Zestaponi
1990 establishments in Georgia (country)
2000 disestablishments in Georgia (country)